The University of Wisconsin System is a university system of public universities in the U.S. state of Wisconsin. It is one of the largest public higher-education systems in the country, enrolling more than 174,000 students each year and employing approximately 39,000 faculty and staff statewide. The University of Wisconsin System is composed of two doctoral research universities, eleven comprehensive universities, and thirteen freshman-sophomore branch campuses.

History 
The present-day University of Wisconsin System was created on October 11, 1971, by Chapter 100, Laws of 1971, which combined the former University of Wisconsin and Wisconsin State Universities systems into an enlarged University of Wisconsin System. The merger was supposed to take effect in 1973; however, the final legislation did not pass until May 1974. The merger took effect on July 9, 1974, combining two chapters of the Wisconsin statutes. The former Chapter 36 (former University of Wisconsin) and Chapter 37 (former Wisconsin State Universities) were merged to create a new Chapter 36 (University of Wisconsin System).

Former University of Wisconsin 
The University of Wisconsin was created by the state constitution in 1848, and held its first classes in Madison in 1849.

In 1956, pressed by the growing demand for a large public university that offered graduate programs in Wisconsin's largest city, Wisconsin lawmakers merged Wisconsin State College of Milwaukee (WSCM) and the University of Wisconsin–Extension's Milwaukee division as the University of Wisconsin–Milwaukee. The new campus consisted of both the WSCM campus near the lakefront and the UW extension in downtown Milwaukee.

Starting in the 1940s, freshman-sophomore centers were opened across the state. In 1968, the Green Bay center was upgraded to a full-fledged four-year institution as the University of Wisconsin–Green Bay, while the Kenosha and Racine centers were merged as the University of Wisconsin–Parkside. By 1971, the University of Wisconsin system consisted of campuses at Madison, Milwaukee, Green Bay and Kenosha/Somers, along with 10 freshman-sophomore centers and the statewide University of Wisconsin–Extension. The total enrollment of the University of Wisconsin system at that time was 69,554. The Board of Regents of the University of Wisconsin system consisted of ten members, nine of whom were appointed by the governor and confirmed by the senate for nine-year terms. The tenth was the State Superintendent of Public Instruction, who served ex officio on both the University of Wisconsin and Wisconsin State University boards.

Former Wisconsin state universities 
In 1866, the state legislature established a normal school at Platteville—the first of eight teacher-training schools across the state. In 1911, the legislature permitted the normal schools to offer two years of post-high school work in art, liberal arts and sciences, pre-law, and pre-medicine. The broadened curriculum proved popular and soon accounted for over one-third of the normal schools' enrollment. In 1920, the Carnegie Foundation for the Advancement of Teaching issued a report on "The Professional Education of Teachers of American Public Schools", which attacked such programs, arguing that normal schools should not deviate from their purpose as trainers of teachers. When the Milwaukee Normal School persisted with its popular enhanced curriculum, the regents of the Normal School system, the legislature, and the governor all became involved. MNS President Carroll G. Pearse was forced to resign in 1923, and the regents ordered the discontinuation of non-teacher-education programs. The issue was not settled, though; public pressure for expanded offerings at normal schools continued to grow, and education professionals asserted that traditional two-year curricula in teacher training were inadequate.

In 1926, the regents repurposed the Normal Schools as "State Teachers Colleges", offering a four-year course of study leading to a Bachelor of Education degree that incorporated significant general education at all levels. The thousands of returning World War II veterans in Wisconsin needed more college choices for their studies under the G.I. Bill, and popular demand pushed the State Teachers College system Regents to once again allow the teacher training institutions to offer bachelor's degrees in liberal arts and fine arts. In 1951 the state teachers colleges were redesignated as "Wisconsin State Colleges," offering a full four-year liberal-arts curriculum. In 1955, the Stout Institute in Menomonie, which had been founded as a private engineering school in 1891 and was sold to the state in 1911, was merged into the Wisconsin State Colleges system; it had previously been governed by a separate state board of regents.

The state colleges were all granted university status as "Wisconsin State Universities" in 1964 (with the exception of Wisconsin State College-Milwaukee, which had become part of the University of Wisconsin in 1956).

As of 1971, the Wisconsin State Universities comprised nine public universities (Platteville, Whitewater, Oshkosh, River Falls, Stout (in Menomonie), Superior, Stevens Point, La Crosse, and Eau Claire) and four freshman-sophomore branch campuses, with a total enrollment of 64,148. The board was made up of 14 members, 13 of whom were appointed by the governor and confirmed by the senate for five-year terms. The 14th was the State Superintendent of Public Instruction.

The University of Wisconsin System 
The University of Wisconsin system merged with the Wisconsin State University system in 1971 to create today's University of Wisconsin System. The 1971 merger law approved by the State Senate combined the two higher education systems in Wisconsin under a single Board of Regents, creating a system with 13 universities, 14 (now 13) freshman-sophomore centers (later colleges, now branch campuses), and a statewide extension with offices in all 72 counties. Each university is named "University of Wisconsin–" followed by the location or name. Each two-year college was named "University of Wisconsin–" followed by the city and/or county in which it is located. The move, intended to enhance the University of Wisconsin's prestige and influence, was resisted by some parties concerned with a possible brand dilution.

The Board of the University of Wisconsin System includes 18 members, 16 of whom are appointed by the Governor and approved by the Senate. Of these 16 members, 14 serve staggered, seven-year terms. The remaining two are two-year-term position filled by current UW System students. The two ex officio members are the State Superintendent of Public Instruction and the president or a designee of the Wisconsin Technical College System Board.

Restructuring 
In October 2017, UW System president Ray Cross publicly proposed a restructuring of the University of Wisconsin System that would bring the UW Colleges under the control of their nearest comprehensive university, creating regional campuses within the system. The proposal also included moving parts of UW-Extension to UW-Madison and UW System administration. UW Colleges Online, which was operating as an additional campus of UW Colleges, would be relocated under UW System administration. President Cross announced this proposal without consulting shared governance groups or administrators. According to the University of Wisconsin System administration, the merger would save money. Critics said the merger was being rushed without input from the campuses and that the system was buckling to political pressure from the state. The proposal was approved by the UW Board of Regents in their November 2017 meeting, implementation began July 1, 2018.

Research universities 

There are two major research universities in the University of Wisconsin System that grant doctoral degrees: the University of Wisconsin–Madison and the University of Wisconsin–Milwaukee. UW-La Crosse began offering doctoral degree programs in 2007 and others followed while remaining primarily undergraduate to master's level institutions.

UW–Madison 

Founded in 1848, University of Wisconsin–Madison is the largest university in the state, and the flagship of the UW System, with a total enrollment of approximately 46,000 students, of whom approximately 34,000 are undergraduates.

UW–Milwaukee 

The University of Wisconsin–Milwaukee, which traces its history back to 1885, is the second largest university in Wisconsin, with an enrollment of over 30,000 students. The university is categorized as an R1: Doctoral Universities – Highest research activity in the Carnegie Classification of Institutions of Higher Education.

Comprehensive universities 

There are eleven comprehensive universities in the University of Wisconsin System that grant baccalaureate and master's degrees with some institutions granting one or two doctorates, usually in professional programs:
UW–Eau Claire
UW–Green Bay
UW–La Crosse
UW–Oshkosh
UW–Parkside in Kenosha
UW–Platteville
UW–River Falls
UW–Stevens Point
UW–Stout in Menomonie
UW–Superior
UW–Whitewater

Branch campuses 

University of Wisconsin Colleges was an institution of the University of Wisconsin System that granted associate degrees at 13 two-year campuses located throughout the state and through an online program. In 2018, the two-year campuses were merged into nearby 4-year universities. Branch campuses include:
UW–Eau Claire – Barron County
UW–Oshkosh, Fond du Lac Campus
UW–Oshkosh, Fox Cities Campus
UW–Green Bay, Manitowoc Campus
UW–Green Bay, Marinette Campus
UW–Green Bay, Sheboygan Campus
UW–Milwaukee at Washington County
UW–Milwaukee at Waukesha
UW–Platteville Baraboo Sauk County
UW–Platteville Richland
UW–Stevens Point at Wausau
UW–Stevens Point at Marshfield
UW–Whitewater at Rock County

UW–Extension 
The University of Wisconsin–Extension operated extension courses statewide through offices in each of Wisconsin's 72 counties. In 2018, UW–Extension merged into UW–Madison.

Controversy 
Since the 1971 union of the universities and colleges under the University of Wisconsin System name, there has been a controversy over the arrangement. The name "University of Wisconsin" is often used to refer to the Madison campus, which has made it difficult for other institutions to make names for themselves. Conversely, many who are connected to UW–Madison have claimed that having so many institutions share the "University of Wisconsin" title has caused a form of brand dilution.

In 2006 and 2009, the students at the Milwaukee campus voted on whether the school should change its name to something that didn't carry the UW name (such as Wisconsin State University or University of Milwaukee). In both cases, a plurality of students voted to retain the name "University of Wisconsin–Milwaukee," but over 50% were in favor of a different name. However, since 2004 the UWM athletic department has dropped the UW prefix and simply refers to the school's athletic teams as the Milwaukee Panthers. UW–Green Bay has since done the same and are officially the Green Bay Phoenix. Other UW system programs are commonly referred to by just the city name as they all play in the same conference, the WIAC, making the 'UW' redundant. The exception is UW–Parkside, who plays in the Division II Great Lakes Intercollegiate Athletic Conference and is most often referred to as simply "Parkside", and UW-Superior, who plays all athletics in the Upper Midwest Athletic Conference, except for Ice Hockey (WIAC).

See also 

University of Wisconsin Hospital and Clinics
University of Wisconsin Credit Union

References

External links 

 
 
Wisconsin